Ravindra Mirlekar  is an Indian politician and leader of Shiv Sena from Maharashtra. He was member of Maharashtra Legislative Council from 1996 to 2002.

Positions held
 1996: Elected to Maharashtra Legislative Council
 2005 Onwards: Deputy Leader, Shiv Sena  
 2013-2015: Shiv Sena Sampark Pramukh Nashik 
 2015: Shiv Sena Sampark Pramukh Jalgaon, Dhule

See also
 List of members of the Maharashtra Legislative Council

References

External links
 Shivsena Home Page

Shiv Sena politicians
Members of the Maharashtra Legislative Council
Living people
Marathi politicians
Year of birth missing (living people)